Sean William Eathorne (born 5 May 1986) is a New Zealand cricketer. He played for the New Zealand at the Under-19 Cricket World Cup in 2004. He played five first-class matches for Otago but scored only 72 runs at an average of 7.20. He was born at Dunedin.

Eathorne was educated at Kavanagh College, Dunedin.

References 

1986 births
People educated at Trinity Catholic College, Dunedin
Living people
New Zealand cricketers
Otago cricketers
Cricketers from Dunedin